Máis Galiza (styled as +Galiza and +G) is a Galician political party which split from the Galician Nationalist Bloc.

External links
Official
Máis Galiza

Social democratic parties in Spain
Socialist parties in Galicia (Spain)
Political parties established in 2011
Former member parties of the Galician Nationalist Bloc